Paul Simon Starke (born 18 November 1990) is an English speedway rider.

Career
Born in Hereford, Starke started his career with the Buxton Hitmen, before going on to have spells at a variety of different clubs during his development into an Elite League rider. Starke's most successful period to date was his two years with the Cradley Heathens in the National League. It was here that he won two league titles, forming a formidable partnership with Steve Worrall during the second year. His first spell in the Elite League was a disappointing one. After being selected by the Birmingham Brummies in the reserve rider draft the club closed midway through the season due to financial problems. Despite this disappointment Starke said he 'enjoyed his time at Birmingham' and described their downfall as a "crying shame." The following season Starke was back in the Elite League, this time being selected in the draft by reigning champions the Poole Pirates.

He spent two years with Glasgow Tigers in 2018 and 2019 and had a short spell with Belle Vue Aces in the SGB Premiership 2018.

In 2021, he signed for the Ipswich Witches in the SGB Premiership and Kent Kings in the SGB Championship. The following season in 2022, he raced again for Ipswich and joined Newcastle Diamonds from Kent but following the demise of Newcastle he switched to the Oxford Cheetahs for the SGB Championship 2022 season. The Cheetahs were returning to action after a 14-year absence from British Speedway.

In 2023, he signed for Plymouth Gladiators for the SGB Championship 2023. He had previously ridden for the Plymouth when they were known as the Devils from 2008 to 2010.

References

1990 births
Living people
English motorcycle racers
Belle Vue Aces riders
Berwick Bandits riders
Birmingham Brummies riders
Buxton Hitmen riders
Cradley Heathens riders
Glasgow Tigers riders
Ipswich Witches riders
Isle of Wight Islanders riders
Newcastle Diamonds riders
Oxford Cheetahs riders
Plymouth Devils riders
Plymouth Gladiators speedway riders
Poole Pirates riders
Rye House Rockets riders
Somerset Rebels riders